Namibia has competed in six Rugby World Cup tournaments, having qualified as the African representative. The Namibian rugby union team, nicknamed the Welwitschias after the Namibian national symbol, made their first appearance at the Rugby World Cup in 1999 and appeared at the following five tournaments. Namibia has so far played 22 games at that cup without ever winning one.

Namibia's best match result was in 2015 when they lost to Georgia by a single point. So far Namibia has not hosted any World Cup games.

By position

1999 Rugby World Cup (Pool C)

2003 Rugby World Cup (Pool A)

2007 Rugby World Cup (Pool D)

2011 Rugby World Cup (Pool D)

2015 Rugby World Cup (Pool C)

2019 Rugby World Cup (Pool B)

Notes:
Despite both teams naming their sides, this match was cancelled following an evacuation order in Kamaishi during Typhoon Hagibis and awarded as a 0–0 draw.

Overall record

Team records
Most points in a game
25 vs  (2011)
22 vs  (2019)
21 vs  (2015)
19 vs  (2015)
18 vs  (1999)

Biggest winning margin
Never won a match.

Highest score against
142 vs  (2003)
87 vs  (2007)
87 vs  (2011)
81 vs  (2011)

Biggest losing margin
142 vs  (2003)
87 vs  (2011)
77 vs  (2007)
74 vs  (2011)

Most tries in a game
3 vs  (2015)
3 vs  (2015)
3 vs  (2019)
2 vs  (1999)
2 vs  (2003)
2 vs  (2007)
2 vs  (2011)
2 vs  (2011)

Individual records
Most appearances overall
14 Eugene Jantjies
11 Jacques Burger
11 Tinus du Plessis
11 Hugo Horn
11 Johnny Redelinghuys

Most points overall
59 Theuns Kotzé
22 Leandre van Dyk
18 Emile Wessels
14 Damian Stevens

Most points in a match
16 Theuns Kotzé vs  (2015)
15 Theuns Kotzé vs  (2011)
10 Jacques Burger vs  (2015)
9 Theuns Kotzé vs  (2015)
9 Damian Stevens vs  (2019)

Most tries overall
2 Jacques Burger
2 Heinz Koll
2 Theuns Kotzé
2 Johann Tromp
2 JC Greyling

Most penalty goals overall
8 Theuns Kotzé
6 Leandre van Dyk
3 Damian Stevens
2 Cliven Loubser
1 Morné Schreuder
1 Emile Wessels

References

 Davies, Gerald (2004) The History of the Rugby World Cup (Sanctuary Publishing Ltd,
 Farr-Jones, Nick, (2003). Story of the Rugby World Cup, Australian Post Corporation,

Rugby World Cup by nation
World Cup